

Gulf Business is a weekly magazine published from Dubai, United Arab Emirates, and focusing on Middle East business news, especially in GCC countries. It was launched in 1996. It is published in Motivate Media Group.

The magazine has reported on a rival magazine, Arabian Business. It has also reported on the Dubai, Sharjah, Ajman (DSA) conurbation of emirates. The magazine is quoted in books.

The magazine uses social media, including Twitter (as "GulfBusiness") since 2009.

Gulf Business Awards
The magazine organizes the annual Gulf Business Awards.

See also
 Arabian Business

References

External links
Official website

1996 establishments in the United Arab Emirates
Magazines established in 1996
Business magazines published in the United Arab Emirates
English-language magazines
Online magazines
Monthly magazines
Mass media in Dubai